Dresden Township is a township in Kingman County, Kansas, USA.  As of the 2000 census, its population was 385.

Geography
Dresden Township covers an area of 36.13 square miles (93.57 square kilometers); of this, 0.07 square miles (0.19 square kilometers) or 0.2 percent is water.

Cities and towns
 Cunningham (north half)

Unincorporated towns
 Skellyville
(This list is based on USGS data and may include former settlements.)

Adjacent townships
 Miami Township, Reno County (north)
 Bell Township, Reno County (northeast)
 Eureka Township (east)
 Union Township (southeast)
 Rural Township (south)
 Township No. 12 Township, Pratt County (west)
 Township No. 6 Township, Pratt County (west)

Cemeteries
The township contains one cemetery, Dresden (also known as Shelman Cemetery).

Major highways
 U.S. Route 54

References
 U.S. Board on Geographic Names (GNIS)
 United States Census Bureau cartographic boundary files

External links
 City-Data.com

Townships in Kingman County, Kansas
Townships in Kansas